The 2018 US egg recall was a product recall for fresh chicken eggs in the United States beginning on April 13, 2018. The United States Department of Agriculture recalled more than 200 million eggs after a salmonella outbreak connected to Iowa egg farms, including Rose Acre Farms.

It was the largest egg recall since 2010.

See also
2018 American salmonella outbreak

References

April 2018 events in the United States
Eggs (food)
Food recalls
Product recalls